The Murchison Widefield Array (MWA) is a joint project between an international consortium of organisations to construct and operate a low-frequency radio array. 'Widefield' refers to its very large field of view (on the order of 30 degrees across). Operating in the frequency range 70–300 MHz, the main scientific goals of the MWA are to detect neutral atomic Hydrogen emission from the cosmological Epoch of Reionization (EoR), to study the sun, the heliosphere, the Earth's ionosphere, and radio transient phenomena, as well as map the extragalactic radio sky. It is located at the Murchison Radio-astronomy Observatory (MRO).

Along with the Australian Square Kilometre Array Pathfinder (ASKAP), also at the MRO, and two radio telescopes in South Africa, the Hydrogen Epoch of Reionization Array (HERA) and MeerKAT, the MWA is one of four precursors to the international project known as the Square Kilometre Array (SKA).

Development
This location offers a quiet radio environment and stable climate for observations. The MRO is also the site of CSIRO's Australian Square Kilometre Array Pathfinder (ASKAP) and one of two selected sites in Australia for the Square Kilometre Array (SKA). In addition to the geographic link, the MWA is one of four official SKA precursor telescopes – instruments that provide instrumental, scientific and operational information to help guide SKA developments, along with two sites in South Africa, HERA and MeerKAT.

The MWA was initially conceived as a 512-tile instrument (512T) to be built in stages. The first stage was a 32-tile prototype (MWA-32T) which was constructed and operated with increasing capability over the period 2007–2011, testing telescope hardware and making preliminary science observations, including initial observations of EoR fields.

The first phase of the telescope, the so-called "Phase I MWA" achieved full practical completion in late 2012 and completed commissioning on 20 June 2013, before moving into full operations. The Phase I MWA fully cross-correlates signals from 128 phased tiles, each of which consist of 16 crossed dipoles arranged in a 4x4 square. As part of a planned future roll out infrastructure on-site at the MRO was installed during Phase I to allow an eventual build-out to 256 tiles. The total cost of the first phase of the project was A$51 million. The Phase I array was largely driven by the second MWA director, Steven Tingay.

In 2017 the telescope received the planned upgrade, doubling both the number of antennas, resulting in an increase in resolution and sensitivity. This upgraded instrument is known as the "Phase II MWA". Phase II was practically completed in October 2017 and officially launched on 23 April 2018. Installation of the additional antennas and commissioning of the array was led by the third MWA director, Randall Wayth and operation of the Phase II instruments have been led by the current director, Melanie Johnston-Hollitt.

Science

The MWA is an inherently versatile instrument with a very large field of view (on the order of 30 degrees across) able to cover a wide range of scientific goals. In Phase I the array provide a wealth of scientific papers covering topics such as detection of H II region(s) in the Galactic plane, limits on radio emission from extra-solar planets, observations of haloes and relics in galaxy clusters to detection of transient radio sources and space debris tracking. Two of the most significant results from the Phase I MWA were:

 The first detection of plasma tubes in the ionosphere by undergraduate student, Cleo Loi. Ms Loi won the Astronomical Society of Australia 2015 Bok Prize for her research.
 The "GaLactic and Extragalactic All-sky MWA" (or "GLEAM") is a survey of 300,000 extragalactic sources at 20 frequencies between 70 and 230 MHz that was carried out by the MWA.

Discoveries
In January 2022, a team led by Dr Natasha Hurley-Walker of Curtin University re-analysed 2018 GLEAM data and announced in ’’Nature’’ that object GLEAM-X J162759.5-523504.3 is a long periodicity (1,091.170 second / 18m11s) object, that provided a bright pulse of energy for up to a minute, and is some 4,000 light years from Earth in the Milky Way Galaxy. The derived position is in the constellation Norma at right ascension 16h 27m 59.5s, declination −52°35′04.3". The object produces pulses at 154MHz of peak flux densities of up to S154MHz = 45 Jy. Scaling this to 1.4 GHz would indicate S1.4 GHz = 3.5 Jy and, therefore, a luminosity L1.4 GHz = 4×10^31ergs^−1. It is speculated to be similar to a pulsar or magnetar. The object was discovered by Tyrone O'Doherty as part of his undergraduate honours project supervised by Dr Hurley-Walker.

System overview

An MWA antenna consists of a four by four regular grid of dual-polarisation dipole elements arranged on a 4m x 4m steel mesh ground plane. Each antenna (with its 16 dipoles) is known as a "tile". Signals from each dipole pass through a low noise amplifier (LNA) and are combined in an analogue beamformer to produce tile beams on the sky. Beamformers sit next to the tiles in the field. The radio frequency (RF) signals from the tile-beams are transmitted to a receiver, each receiver being able to process the signals from a group of eight tiles. Receivers therefore sit in the field, close to groups of eight tiles; cables between receivers and beamformers carry data, power and control signals. Power for the receivers is provided from a central generator. The receiver contains analogue elements to condition the signals in preparation for sampling and digitisation. The frequency range 80–300 MHz is Nyquist-sampled at high precision. Digital elements in the receiver (after the digitiser) are used to transform the time-series data to the frequency domain with a 1.28 MHz resolution – 5 bits real and 5 bits imaginary for each resolution element. Sets of 1.28 MHz coarse frequency channels are transmitted via an optical fibre connection to the correlator subsystem, located in the CSIRO Data Processing Facility near the MWA site. MWA shares the CSIRO facility with the ASKAP program.

In Phase I the majority of the tiles (112) were scattered across a roughly 1.5 km core region, forming an array with very high imaging quality, and a field of view of several hundred square degrees at a resolution of several arcminutes. The remaining 16 tiles are placed at locations outside the core, yielding baseline distances of about 3 km to allow higher angular resolution observations.

In Phase II the MWA operated in two configurations, a compact configuration and an extended configuration of 128 tiles each. The compact configuration consists of seven Phase I receivers and 56 tiles, plus 72 new tiles arranged in two dense hexagonal configurations each of 36 close-packed tiles. The new hexagonal super tiles in the compact configuration make use of the concept of "redundant spacings" to help calibrate the array to high precision for detection of the EoR. The extended configuration consists of nine Phase I receivers and 72 original tiles, plus an additional 56 new long baseline  tiles which provide baselines distances of about 5 km.

The original correlator subsystem comprises Poly-phase Filter Bank (PFB) boards that convert the 1.28 MHz coarse frequency channels into channels with 10 kHz frequency resolution in preparation for cross-correlation. Correlator boards then cross-multiply signals from all tiles to form visibility data. A distributed clock signal drives the coherence of receivers in the field and maintains timing for the correlator. This system is only capable of ingesting the data from 128 tiles and thus while the array currently comprises 256 tiles, only half of the tiles are correlated at a time, giving rise to the two configurations discussed above. The MWA Collaboration plan to replace this correlator in the near future with a newer machine, capable of ingesting the data from all 256 tiles.

The MWA is operated remotely through an interface to a Monitor and Control (M&C) software package resident on a dedicated computer located within the CSIRO Data Processing Facility at the MWA site. The M&C software maintains a state-based description of the hardware and an event-driven database describing the observation scheduling of the Instrument. M&C software commands several elements of the system including pointing and tracking of the beamformers, frequency selection of the receivers, correlation parameters for the correlator, and RTC/RTS functions, amongst others. The M&C system contributes to the MWA archive by storing instrument "metadata" into an external database. This includes both the instrument configurations for each observation and also housekeeping information collected from various hardware components.

Data are transferred from the site to the MWA archive located at the end of a high-bandwidth network connection. The primary MWA data archive is located in Perth at the Pawsey Supercomputing Centre. As of December 2018 the resultant initially calibrated data are then provided to the international astronomical community via the MWA node of the Australian All-Sky Virtual Observatory (ASVO). Significant processed data products produced by the MWA Collaboration such as the initial release of the GLEAM survey are also available via various international scientific databases for subsequent analysis and interpretation.

Project partners
During Phase I, the MWA consortium initially comprised 110 individual researchers drawn from 12 institutions from Australia, NZ, the US, and India. New Zealand joined the consortium in late 2011 and an additional two institutions from the US were added in 2014 taking the total number of Phase I partner organisations to 14. By the end of Phase I there were 160 individual research scientists involved in the MWA.

Membership of the MWA consortium was substantially expanded for Phase II with the admission of Canada, China and Japan, though India left the consortium at this time. Nevertheless, at the start of Phase II the MWA had expanded to 21 partner organisations across 6 countries and had a membership of 270 individual scientists. The expansion of the collaboration was largely the work of the then MWA Board Chair (Jan 2014 – Jan 2018) and current MWA director, Melanie Johnston-Hollitt.

The MWA Project is composed of the following project partners as of 2018:

 Curtin University (Lead Organization)
 Australian National University
 Brown University
 CSIRO
 Kagoshima University
 Kumamoto University
 Nagoya University

 NAOJ
 Shanghai Astronomical Observatory
 Swinburne University of Technology
 Tohoku University
 University of California, Berkeley/Breakthrough Listen
 University of Melbourne
 University of Sydney

 University of Toronto
 University of Tokyo
 University of Washington
 University of Western Australia
 University of Wisconsin-Milwaukee
 Victoria University of Wellington
 Western Sydney University

Funding for the MWA to date has been provided by partner institutions and by allocations from national funding agencies: the New Zealand Ministry of Economic Development (now the Ministry of Business, Innovation and Employment), the US National Science Foundation, the Australian Research Council (ARC), the Australian National Collaborative Research Infrastructure Strategy (NCRIS) administered by Astronomy Australia Ltd., and the Australia-India Strategic Research Fund Overview (AISRF). In addition, support for the MWA compute hardware was given through an IBM Shared University Research Grant awarded to Victoria University of Wellington and Curtin University (PIs: Johnston-Hollitt and Tingay).

See also
List of astronomical observatories
LOFAR

References

External links

Radio telescopes
Astronomical observatories in Western Australia
Harvard University
Square Kilometre Array
Shire of Murchison
Interferometric telescopes